Bayt Lif   is a village in the  Bint Jbeil District in southern Lebanon.

Name
According to E. H. Palmer, the name means "the house of lif" (palm-fibre).

History
In 1852,  Edward Robinson noted that the year before, a quantity of gold coin were found at Beit Lif, which was taken to Beirut and given to the Pasha. He further noted that the people were planting millet and tobacco.

In 1875, Victor Guérin found here a village with 80 Metuali inhabitants.

In 1881, the PEF's Survey of Western Palestine (SWP)  described it as: "A village, built of stone, containing about 150 Moslems [..] situated on a hill-top, with a few olives and arable land. Two cisterns and a birket near supply the water."

On 23 November 1997 a South Lebanon Army compound on the edge of the village came under artillery fire. Eight civilians were killed. Amal was believed to be responsible for the shelling.

References

Bibliography

External links
 Beit Lif, Localiban
Survey of Western Palestine, Map 4: IAA, Wikimedia commons

Populated places in the Israeli security zone 1985–2000
Populated places in Bint Jbeil District
Shia Muslim communities in Lebanon